Mutton's Mill (also known as Manor House Mill) is a windpump located on the Halvergate Marshes in the detached parish of Freethorpe within The Broads in the English county of Norfolk. It lies close to the route of the Weavers' Way long-distance footpath.

History 

The mill was last worked in 1947 by Mr Fred Mutton (hence the name Mutton's Mill) and was used to drain the surrounding marshland into the Halvergate Fleet. The mill is now in private ownership and in 1984 a new cap and six-bladed fantail followed by one pair of patent sails in 1998. The mill's restored fantail was blown off the mill in 2005; however, it has since been replaced during 2008. From time to time it is possible to see the sails turning.

References

External links
 Information regarding many of the windpumps on Halvergate Marshes

Windmills of the Norfolk Broads
Tower mills in the United Kingdom
Grade II* listed buildings in Norfolk